Bankhead is a surname. Notable people with the surname include:

James Bankhead (1783–1856), United States Army general
John Bankhead (disambiguation), several people
Lester Oliver Bankhead (1912–1997), American architect
Scott Bankhead (born 1963), American baseball player
Tallulah Bankhead (1902–1968), American actress
Todd Bankhead (born 1977), American football player
Tommy Bankhead (1931–2000), American musician
Walter W. Bankhead (1897–1988), American politician
William B. Bankhead (1874–1940), American politician

Bankhead brothers
 
The Bankhead brothers were a five African-American brothers who played Negro league baseball in the early- to mid-20th century, as follows:

Dan Bankhead (1920–1976)
Fred Bankhead (1912–1972)
Garnett Bankhead (1928–1991)
Joe Bankhead (1926–1988)
Sam Bankhead (1910–1976)